Farsetia inconspicua is a species of flowering plant in the family Brassicaceae. It is found only in Yemen. Its natural habitats are subtropical or tropical dry shrubland and rocky areas.

References

inconspicua
Endemic flora of Socotra
Vulnerable flora of Africa
Taxonomy articles created by Polbot